Taiwo Rafiu (born 18 June 1972 in Lagos State) is a Nigerian women's basketball player. She attended Oklahoma City University in the United States and with the Nigeria women's national basketball team at the 2004 Summer Olympics.

References

1972 births
Living people
Nigerian women's basketball players
Yoruba sportswomen
Basketball players at the 2004 Summer Olympics
Olympic basketball players of Nigeria
Oklahoma City University alumni
Nigerian expatriate basketball people in the United States
Sportspeople from Lagos State
Beijing Great Wall players